Philip Goodman may refer to:

 Philip H. Goodman (1914–1976), American politician in Maryland
 Philip S. Goodman (1926–2015), American screenwriter, producer, and director